The discography of Alfred García, a Spanish singer. He released his debut studio album, Beginning in 2012. García self-produced and self-published the album. He released his second studio album, Inblack (Volume One) in December 2016. He once again self-produced and self-published the album. In 2017, he took part in series nine of the reality television talent competition Operación Triunfo, where he finished in fourth place. He also represented Spain at the Eurovision Song Contest 2018, along with Amaia, with the song "Tu canción". They finished in twenty-third place. His third studio album, 1016 was released in December 2018. The album peaked at number two on the Spanish Albums Chart. The album includes the singles "De la Tierra hasta Marte", "Wonder" and "Londres". He re-released the album titled, 1016. El Círculo Rojo in November 2019 and includes the single "Amar volar al invierno".

Albums

Studio albums

Studio album reissues

Live albums

Singles

As lead artist

As featured artist

Selected releases from Operación Triunfo 2017

Other charted songs

References

Discographies of Spanish artists